The 1993 TAC Cup season was the 2nd season of the TAC Cup competition.

The league expanded from the inaugural six teams, all based in Melbourne or Geelong, to a ten-team statewide league by including teams from Bendigo, Ballarat, Gippsland and Murray regions.

The competition was won by the Northern Knights after when they crushed the Western Jets in the grand final by 83 points claiming their 1st of four consecutive premierships.

Dean Watson from Southern Stingrays won the Morrish Medal, with Angelo Lekkas winning the coaches player of the year award and Shannon Gibson the TAC Medal for being the best player in the Grand Final.

Clubs

Ladder

Grand Final

References

NAB League
Nab League